The Concurso Internacional de Tenis – San Sebastián is a tennis tournament held in San Sebastián, Spain. The event is part of the Association of Tennis Professionals (ATP) Challenger Tour and is played on outdoor red clay courts.

Past finals

Singles

Doubles

External links 
  
ITF Search

 
ATP Challenger Tour
Clay court tennis tournaments
Tennis tournaments in Spain